The 1996 East Tennessee State Buccaneers football team represented East Tennessee State University as a member of the Southern Conference (SoCon) during the 1996 NCAA Division I-AA football season. Led by Mike Cavan in his fifth and final season as head coach, the Buccaneers compiled an overall record of 10–3 with a mark of 7–1 in conference play, placing second in the SoCon behind Marshall. East Tennessee State advanced to the NCAA Division I-AA Football Championship playoffs, where they beat Villanova in the first round before falling to Montana in the quarterfinals.

Schedule

References

East Tennessee State
East Tennessee State Buccaneers football seasons
East Tennessee State Buccaneers football